Havering Residents Association (HRA) is a group of residents' associations and registered political party in London, England. It is active in the London Borough of Havering and forms a 17-councillor group on Havering London Borough Council. At the 2014 London borough council elections they were the second largest party on Havering Council, largest elected residents group in London, and the fourth largest political party represented on all London borough councils. Not all residents groups in Havering are affiliated to the HRA, usually indicating this by standing as 'independent resident' candidates. In 2014 eight members of the Havering Residents Association group split off to form the East Havering Residents Group.

Havering London Borough Council
The residents association is represented on Havering London Borough Council where they are the second largest party and opposition group.

2010 election
At the 2010 London borough council elections the Havering Residents Association stood candidates in 15 of the 18 wards in Havering. 12 of the 45 candidates were elected as councillors.

The following were elected/stood in each ward of Havering:

They did not have candidates in Rainham and Wennington, or South Hornchurch where other residents groups had candidates. Councillors elected from those wards form a separate 'independent resident' group on Havering Council. No residents candidates stood in Brooklands.

2014 election
At the 2014 London borough council elections the Havering Residents Association stood candidates in 12 of the 18 wards, with 34 candidates of which 19 were elected.

2014 split
In 2014 eight members of the Havering Residents Association group, including the leader Clarence Barrett, split off to form East Havering Residents Group.

London Assembly
Havering Residents Association stood a candidate for the Havering and Redbridge constituency at the 2000 London Assembly elections and received 12,831 votes. They have not contested any further London Assembly elections.

References

Locally based political parties in England
Politics of the London Borough of Havering
Politics of the London Borough of Redbridge